Lake Bill Waller is a 168-acre man-made lake, named for former Governor of Mississippi Bill Waller. It is located in Marion County, Mississippi, seven miles southeast of Columbia, and is primarily used for angling.

History
In 1995, Lake Bill Waller produced the second-largest largemouth bass (15 lb. 14 oz.) ever caught in the state. It closed in 2003 and reopened in 2007 following draining, renovation and restocking with game fish.

Management
Lake Bill Waller is continually monitored by Mississippi biologists to maintain the production of trophy and eating-sized fish, with a catch and release focus. Manager Tim Barber described their efforts:

All the bass 18 inches or longer must be released back into the lake. We also encourage anglers to keep 15 bass, 18-inches and under, per person per day. Some of the fish less than 18 inches weigh from 2 1/2 to 3 pounds each, which are really good eating-size bass. We encourage our fishermen to catch and eat these bass to keep the lake in balance.

References

Bill Waller
Landforms of Marion County, Mississippi